The meridian 125° east of Greenwich is a line of longitude that extends from the North Pole across the Arctic Ocean, Asia, Australia, the Indian Ocean, the Southern Ocean, and Antarctica to the South Pole.

The 125th meridian east forms a great circle with the 55th meridian west.

From Pole to Pole
Starting at the North Pole and heading south to the South Pole, the 125th meridian east passes through:

{| class="wikitable plainrowheaders"
! scope="col" width="130" | Co-ordinates
! scope="col" | Country, territory or sea
! scope="col" | Notes
|-
| style="background:#b0e0e6;" | 
! scope="row" style="background:#b0e0e6;" | Arctic Ocean
| style="background:#b0e0e6;" |
|-
| style="background:#b0e0e6;" | 
! scope="row" style="background:#b0e0e6;" | Laptev Sea
| style="background:#b0e0e6;" |
|-valign="top"
| 
! scope="row" | 
| Sakha Republic — islands of the Lena Delta and the mainland Amur Oblast — from 
|-valign="top"
| 
! scope="row" | 
| Heilongjiang Inner Mongolia — from  Heilongjiang — from  Jilin — from  Liaoning — from 
|-
| 
! scope="row" | 
|
|-
| style="background:#b0e0e6;" | 
! scope="row" style="background:#b0e0e6;" | Yellow Sea
| style="background:#b0e0e6;" | Korea Bay
|-
| 
! scope="row" | 
| Island of Sok-do and the mainland
|-
| style="background:#b0e0e6;" | 
! scope="row" style="background:#b0e0e6;" | Yellow Sea
| style="background:#b0e0e6;" |
|-
| 
! scope="row" | 
|
|-
| style="background:#b0e0e6;" | 
! scope="row" style="background:#b0e0e6;" | Yellow Sea
| style="background:#b0e0e6;" |
|-
| 
! scope="row" | 
| Island of Kirin-do
|-
| style="background:#b0e0e6;" | 
! scope="row" style="background:#b0e0e6;" | Yellow Sea
| style="background:#b0e0e6;" | Passing just west of the island of Gageodo,  (at )
|-valign="top"
| style="background:#b0e0e6;" | 
! scope="row" style="background:#b0e0e6;" | East China Sea
| style="background:#b0e0e6;" | Passing just west of the island of Shimojishima,  (at ) Passing just east of the island of Taramajima,  (at )
|-
| style="background:#b0e0e6;" | 
! scope="row" style="background:#b0e0e6;" | Pacific Ocean
| style="background:#b0e0e6;" | Philippine Sea
|-
| 
! scope="row" | 
| Islands of Samar and Leyte
|-
| style="background:#b0e0e6;" | 
! scope="row" style="background:#b0e0e6;" | Sogod Bay
| style="background:#b0e0e6;" |
|-
| 
! scope="row" | 
| Island of Leyte
|-
| style="background:#b0e0e6;" | 
! scope="row" style="background:#b0e0e6;" | Bohol Sea
| style="background:#b0e0e6;" |
|-
| 
! scope="row" | 
| Island of Mindanao
|-
| style="background:#b0e0e6;" | 
! scope="row" style="background:#b0e0e6;" | Celebes Sea
| style="background:#b0e0e6;" |
|-
| 
! scope="row" | 
| Island of Sulawesi
|-
| style="background:#b0e0e6;" | 
! scope="row" style="background:#b0e0e6;" | Molucca Sea
| style="background:#b0e0e6;" |
|-
| 
! scope="row" | 
| Island of Taliabu
|-
| style="background:#b0e0e6;" | 
! scope="row" style="background:#b0e0e6;" | Banda Sea
| style="background:#b0e0e6;" |
|-
| 
! scope="row" | 
| Island of Alor
|-
| style="background:#b0e0e6;" | 
! scope="row" style="background:#b0e0e6;" | Savu Sea
| style="background:#b0e0e6;" |
|-
| 
! scope="row" | 
| Island of Timor
|-
| 
! scope="row" | 
| Island of Timor
|-
| 
! scope="row" | 
| Island of Timor
|-
| 
! scope="row" | 
| Island of Timor
|-
| style="background:#b0e0e6;" | 
! scope="row" style="background:#b0e0e6;" | Timor Sea
| style="background:#b0e0e6;" |
|-
| style="background:#b0e0e6;" | 
! scope="row" style="background:#b0e0e6;" | Indian Ocean
| style="background:#b0e0e6;" |
|-
| 
! scope="row" | 
| Western Australia — the Maret Islands and the mainland
|-
| style="background:#b0e0e6;" | 
! scope="row" style="background:#b0e0e6;" | Indian Ocean
| style="background:#b0e0e6;" | Australian authorities consider this to be part of the Southern Ocean
|-
| style="background:#b0e0e6;" | 
! scope="row" style="background:#b0e0e6;" | Southern Ocean
| style="background:#b0e0e6;" |
|-
| 
! scope="row" | Antarctica
| Australian Antarctic Territory, claimed by 
|-
|}

See also
124th meridian east
126th meridian east

References

e125 meridian east